Pamela McColl is a Canadian publishing entrepreneur and advocate of children's issues and smoking cessation, best known for releasing a smoke-free version of the classic Twas The Night Before Christmas.

Career

She has been published in the Birth Institute journal on the smoking cessation and the use of marijuana in pregnancy. She is a director on the advisory council of the national not-for-profit corporation Smart Approaches to Marijuana Canada. In 2015, she compiled the book On Marijuana – a powerful examination of what marijuana use means for our children, our communities and our future, a collection of essays and articles from those who oppose increasing the availability of and access to cannabis.

She is the publisher of seven books, including Pacific Spirit: The Forest Reborn, which United States Senator Frank Murkowski, the chair of the Senate Committee on Energy and Natural Resources, labelled as “one of the most important works on forest management” in recent years.

McColl's company Grafton and Scratch Publishing published Baby and Me Tobacco Free, which she co-authored with Laurie Adams. It also published her new, "smoke-free" version of Twas The Night Before Christmas, which attracted attention from news outlets in several countries, including The New York Post, Huffington Post, CBC Radio,<ref>"Santa quits smoking in edited version of Twas the Night Before Christmas] The Current. Retrieved 2014-6-22.</ref> The Scotsman, and The Telegraph. Stephen Colbert mentioned the book on his show, commenting, "Santa can't quit smoking, he needs that vice". The book won several awards, including three Benjamin Franklin Book Awards from the Independent Book Publisher's Association, and a Moonbeam Children’s Book Award.

References

External links
 [http://www.twasthenightbeforechristmas.ca/ Twas the Night Before Christmas'' official site

Canadian publishers (people)
Living people
Year of birth missing (living people)